Jakub Trefný (born March 12, 1981) is a Czech professional ice hockey defenceman. He played with HC Karlovy Vary in the Czech Extraliga during the 2010–11 Czech Extraliga season.

References

External links

1981 births
Czech ice hockey defencemen
HC Karlovy Vary players
Living people
People from Louny
Sportspeople from the Ústí nad Labem Region
Piráti Chomutov players
Sportovní Klub Kadaň players